Oggi ti amo di più is a compilation album by Italian singer Mina, released on February 1988 by PDU.

The album includes new versions of Mina's classic hits "Il cielo in una stanza" and "E se domani".

Track listing

Personnel
 Mina – vocals (all tracks)
 Pino Presti – arrangement (1, 2, 9)
 Alberto Nicorelli – arrangement (3)
 Renato Sellani – arrangement, piano (4, 10)
 Mario Robbiani – arrangement (5)
 Gian Piero Reverberi – arrangement (6, 7)
 Augusto Martelli – arrangement (8)
 Gabriel Yared – arrangement (11)
 Bruno Canfora – arrangement (12)
 Nuccio Rinaldis – audio engineer

Charts

References

External links
 

Mina (Italian singer) compilation albums
1988 compilation albums
Albums conducted by Pino Presti
Albums arranged by Pino Presti